Gregory Kane or Greg Kane may refer to:

Greg Kane (musician) (born 1966), Scottish musician
Gregory Kane (journalist) (–2014), American journalist
Greg Kane (rugby union) (born 1952), New Zealand rugby union player